Brian Devening (born July 16, 1967) is a former professional tennis player from the United States.

Career
Devening was the American Hardcourt Championship winner in 1983 and was ranked amongst the top 25 juniors for six years.

Before turning professional, Devening played tennis for Southern Methodist University, from where he would graduate with a business degree. On the ATP Tour he made his appearances mostly in the doubles circuit.

He made the second round of a Grand Slam doubles tournament just once, at the 1994 Wimbledon Championships with countryman Greg Van Emburgh. The pair defeated the Australian pairing of Darren Cahill and John Fitzgerald. As a singles player he reached the second round of the French Open in 1993, beating Frédéric Fontang. His only other singles appearance was in Wimbledon that year, where he lost to seventh seed Ivan Lendl in four sets.

The American reached two ATP finals during his career, both in 1993, at Båstad and Santiago. He also exited in the semi-final stage of four tournaments, Prague and Tel Aviv in 1992, then Mexico City and Rosmalen in 1994.

ATP career finals

Doubles: 2 (0–2)

Challenger titles

Doubles: (1)

References

External links
 
 

1967 births
Living people
Tennis players from Dallas
Sportspeople from Milwaukee
American male tennis players
Tennis people from Wisconsin
SMU Mustangs men's tennis players